George Archibald is a Canadian politician. He represented the constituency of Kings North in the Nova Scotia House of Assembly from 1984 to 1999. He sat as a member of the Progressive Conservative Party.

Archibald was first elected in 1984, was re-elected in 1988, 1993 and 1998. He did not re-offer in 1999.

Archibald served in the Executive Council of Nova Scotia as Minister of Transportation, and Minister of Agriculture.

References

Living people
Canadian people of Ulster-Scottish descent
Progressive Conservative Association of Nova Scotia MLAs
People from Kings County, Nova Scotia
Members of the Executive Council of Nova Scotia
1946 births